Lamprechtshausen is a municipality in the district of Salzburg-Umgebung in the state of Salzburg in Austria.

Geography
Lamprechtshausen lies in the north of the district of Salzburg-Umgebung in the Flachgau about 22 km north of the city of Salzburg in the Salzburg Prealps. The municipality is partly flat and partly slightly hilly. It has very little forest.  The municipality of Lamprechtshausen is divided into four cadastral communities: Arnsdorf, Lamprechtshausen, Schwerting, and St. Alban.

References

Cities and towns in Salzburg-Umgebung District